Paweł Edelman (born 26 June 1958) is a Polish cinematographer from Łódź, known for his collaborations with acclaimed directors Roman Polanski and Andrzej Wajda. He was named Best European Cinematographer in 2002 at the European Film Awards for his work on The Pianist, for which he also won the César Award for Best Cinematography. He was nominated for an Academy Award and a BAFTA for the same film. He also received a nomination for Outstanding Achievement in Cinematography from the American Society of Cinematographers for Ray. His credits include films both in and outside Poland.

Filmography
Short film

Feature film

Television

References

External links
Pawel Edelman webpage
 
 Paweł Edelman at Culture.pl

1958 births
Living people
European Film Award for Best Cinematographer winners
Film people from Łódź
Polish cinematographers
20th-century Polish Jews
21st-century Polish Jews
Łódź Film School alumni
University of Łódź alumni